Pelago is the debut studio album by American country music artist Ryan Hurd. It was released on October 15, 2021, via Sony Music Nashville. Its lead single, "Chasing After You", is certified Platinum by the RIAA.

Content 
The album's release was preceded by the single "Chasing After You" with Maren Morris. The song reached number two on Country Airplay, giving Hurd his first top 5 single on the chart. "Pass It On" was released as the album's second single on February 22, 2022. Hurd co-wrote all but one of the album's tracks.

Critical reception 
Nicole Piering of Country Swag wrote that with Hurd "having co-written ten of the album’s eleven tracks, Pelago truly continues" his "introduction as both a brilliant songwriter and an incredibly talented artist" and that "while it would be easy for Ryan Hurd to make a living as a writer, evidenced by his ever-growing and impressive body of work, he’s even more magical as an artist." Stephen Thomas Erlewine of AllMusic similarly wrote that  the album "is filled with easy melodies, gilded surfaces, and soft R&B rhythms, a warm setting that allows Hurd to sound empathetic yet masculine."

Commercial performance 
Pelago debuted at number 11 on the Top Country Albums chart, and peaked at number 71 on the Billboard 200.

Track listing

Personnel 
Tracks 1-11 adapted from Pelago liner notes. Tracks 12-15 adapted from Spotify.

Musicians 
 Ryan Hurd — lead/background vocals
 Phil Lawson — drums/percussion
 Tony Lucido — bass
 Ilya Toshinsky — acoustic guitar, dobro, ukulele
 Aaron Eshuis — acoustic guitar, electric guitar, keyboards, programming, background vocals
 Matthew McGinn — acoustic guitar, electric guitar, keyboards, programming, background vocals
 Joe Clemmons — acoustic guitar
 Derek Wells — electric guitar
 Teddy Reimer — guitars, synth, programming
 Dave Cohen — keyboards
 Jesse Frasure — synth, programming
 Justin Niebank — programming
 Jason Saenz — trumpet
 Charlie Judge — strings
 Jun Iwasaki — violin
 David Davidson — violin
 Dave Angell — violin
 Alicia Enstrom — violin
 Kristin Wilkinson — viola
 Monisa Angell — viola
 Kevin Bate — cello
 Carole Rabinowitz — cello
 Katie Ohh — background vocals
 Maren Morris — duet vocals (track 3), background vocals
 Ben Caver — background vocals
 Michael Hardy — background vocals

Technical 
 Aaron Eshuis — producer (all tracks), digital editing
 Teddy Reimer — producer (track 3)
 Jesse Frasure — producer (track 9)
 Dann Huff — producer (tracks 12 and 14)
 Mark Trussell — producer (track 15)
 Chris Small — digital editing
 Mike Stankiewicz — digital editing
 Manny Marroquin — mixing
 Nathan Dantzler — mastering
 Mike Griffith — production coordinator

Charts

Weekly charts

Year-end charts

References 

2021 debut albums
Arista Nashville albums